Rick McNair (born September 10, 1971) is an American water polo player. He competed in the men's tournament at the 1996 Summer Olympics.

References

External links
 

1971 births
Living people
American male water polo players
Olympic water polo players of the United States
Water polo players at the 1996 Summer Olympics
Sportspeople from Berkeley, California